Doctortown is a ghost town in Wayne County, Georgia. The GNIS classifies it as a populated place.

History
The first white settlement at Doctortown was made in 1827, at the site where a Native American village once stood. A post office was established at Doctortown in 1857, and remained in operation until 1967. The community was named for the fact a medicine man once had lived near the original town site.

References

Ghost towns in Georgia (U.S. state)
Landforms of Wayne County, Georgia